Nedumpuram  is a village in Tiruvalla,  Pathanamthitta district in the state of Kerala, India.It Comes Under Thiruvalla Sub-District & Thiruvalla Constituency.

Nedumpuram is the birthplace of Federal Bank. The Federal Bank Limited (the erstwhile Travancore Federal Bank Limited) was incorporated with an authorized capital of ₹5000 from Pattamukkil Varattisseril Brother's at Pattamukkil Varattisseril Ancestral Home, Nedumpuram a place near Thiruvalla in Central Travancore on 28 April 1931 under the Travancore Company's Act, 1916. It started with the business of auction-chitty and elementary banking transactions related to agriculture and industry. The home functioned as the bank office for nearly 15 years.

Demographics
 India census, Nedumpuram had a population of 12,960 with 6,202 males and 6,758 females.

Important places
 Podiyadi
 Pulikeezu
 Chathankary
 ANC Junction
 Manippuzha

Educational Institutions
 NPGHS, Nedumpram

References

Villages in Pathanamthitta district
Villages in Thiruvalla taluk